The United States Navy began building a series of battlecruisers in the 1920s, more than a decade after their slower and less heavily armed armored cruisers had been rendered obsolete by the Royal Navy's  battlecruisers. Construction of these ships was abandoned under the terms of an armaments limitation treaty, though two were completed as aircraft carriers. The US Navy subsequently ordered six "large cruisers"—which are often considered battlecruisers by historians—in 1940, of which only two entered service.

At first unconvinced of the importance of the superior speed of the British battlecruisers, the US Navy changed its position after evaluating the new type of ship in fleet exercises and  Naval War College wargames, and after the Japanese acquisition of four s in the early 1910s. The Secretary of the Navy initially refused the General Board's suggested procurement of several battlecruisers, but fleet exercises revealed that the Navy lacked forces that could effectively find and track an enemy fleet in any weather, and a consensus gradually emerged that battlecruisers would be ideal for this role. Battlecruisers were effective when concentrating their fire on an enemy fleet's leading ships, as the Japanese armored cruisers had done to the Russians at the Battle of Tsushima in 1905. Another role envisioned was tracking down and destroying enemy commerce raiders. British experience during the Battle of the Falkland Islands in late 1914 and the Battle of Dogger Bank the following year, where British battlecruisers caught and destroyed German armored cruisers, confirmed all these capabilities.

When Congress authorized a large naval building program in 1916, six s were included. None were completed before the arms-limiting Washington Naval Treaty was ratified in 1922; four were broken up on the slipway and two were converted into the aircraft carriers Lexington (CV-2) and Saratoga (CV-3). The treaty forestalled any further development of battlecruisers for the next decade and a half, but a number of countries experimented with "cruiser-killer" ships in the late 1930s that were designed to destroy the post-London Naval Treaty heavy cruisers. These designs were formally designated as battlecruisers by the Dutch and Soviets and as large cruisers by the Japanese and Americans, but all were roughly equivalent and all were commonly called battlecruisers. The US Navy's main impetus for the Alaska class was the threat posed by Japanese cruisers raiding its lines of communication in the event of war. Heavy cruisers were also the most likely surface threat to aircraft carriers making independent raids, so a cruiser-killer was also an ideal carrier escort. Reports of a Japanese equivalent reinforced the Navy's desire for these ships. Two were commissioned in time to serve during the last year of World War II, but were decommissioned two years after the war.

Key

Lexington class

The design of the Lexington-class battlecruisers was approved on 30 June 1916 and six were planned as part of the massive 1916 building program, but their construction was repeatedly postponed in favor of escort ships and anti-submarine vessels. The General Board regarded the design's firepower as inadequate and took the opportunity offered by the postponement to order a redesign to improve the ships' armament to include eight  and sixteen  guns. After the Americans entered World War I in April 1917, the Royal Navy furnished more information from its analyses of the Battle of Jutland, in which three British battlecruisers were destroyed by magazine explosions, and provided detailed information on the heavily armored design of the s then under construction.

In World War II, Lexington conducted several raids on Japanese bases before being sunk during the Battle of Coral Sea in May 1942. Saratoga sank the  during the Battle of the Eastern Solomons three months later, then supported a number of American operations in the Pacific before being attached to the British Eastern Fleet for operations in the Indian Ocean. Though she was torpedoed twice, Saratoga survived the war, and was destroyed as a target ship during Operation Crossroads, a series of atomic bomb tests at Bikini Atoll in mid-1946.

Alaska class

The Alaska-class cruisers were six very large cruisers ordered on 9 September 1940. They were known, popularly and by some historians, as "battlecruisers", although the Navy and at least one prominent historian discouraged describing them as such and gave them the hull symbol for large cruisers (CB). All were named after territories or insular areas of the United States, unlike battleships, generally named for states, or cruisers, named for cities. Initial design work for a "cruiser-killer" began in 1938, although the design was not finalized until June 1941. Of the six ships ordered in September 1940, only three were laid down; two of these were completed, and the third's construction was suspended on 16 April 1947 when she was 84% complete.

 and  served for the last year of World War II as bombardment ships and fast carrier escorts. Once the two ships reached Bayonne, New Jersey in late 1945 and early 1946, they never left port again. Numerous plans to convert Hawaii into a guided-missile cruiser or a large command ship in the years after the war were fruitless, and she was sold for scrap in 1959, two years before her sisters.

Notes

Footnotes

References

Further reading
 
 
 
 

 
United States
Battlecruisers